Barnagar College (Assamese: বৰনগৰ মহাবিদ্যালয়) is an educational institution in Barpeta. The college is affiliated with the University of Gauhati. It is the third-oldest college in the district. It has been imparting education to many students from an area predominantly inhabited by socially and economically backward segments of the population.

History
It was established on 3 September 1962. By December 1972 it was brought under the deficit system of grants-in-aid by the Government of Assam. It has been affiliated to the U.G.C. Under 2(f) since 1969. The college has been accredited "B" grade by the NAAC (National Assessment And Accreditation Council), Bangalore in 2004. The college was started by Ghanashyam Talukdar, a local educationist and socio-political figure as a night college, with the goal of providing educational opportunities to the poor students of the region.

Departments 
The college have different departments for every courses and programmes:
 Accountancy
 Assamese
 Botany
 Chemistry
 Economics
 Education
 English
 Finance
 History
 Management
 Mathematics
 Philosophy
 Physics
 Zoology

Two and three year degrees are awarded in arts, science and in finance, as well as vocational diplomas in tourism and travel management, and computer application. Recently, post graduate courses have been introduced in political science, Assamese and history.

References

External links
 Official website

Educational institutions established in 1962
Gauhati University
Universities and colleges in Assam
1962 establishments in Assam
Colleges affiliated to Gauhati University